James Alton Banks III (born January 16, 1998) is an American professional basketball player for the Texas Legends of the NBA G League. He played college basketball for the Georgia Tech Yellow Jackets and the Texas Longhorns. In 2020-21 he led the Israel Basketball Premier League in blocked shots per game.

High school career
Banks grew up playing football until eighth grade. He did not play competitive basketball until his freshman year of high school. He initially attended Columbia High School in DeKalb County, Georgia and St. Francis High School in Alpharetta, Georgia. He averaged 23 points and 14 rebounds per game as a junior at Mount Vernon Presbyterian School in Atlanta. After being ruled ineligible by the Georgia High School Association for using an incorrect address, he transferred to La Lumiere School in La Porte, Indiana for his senior year. Banks led La Lumiere to its first ever appearance at the High School Nationals title game. A consensus four-star recruit, he committed to play college basketball for the University of Texas at Austin on October 8, 2015.

College career
Banks played sparingly in his two years playing for the Texas Longhorns, averaging under two points per game.

After his sophomore season, he transferred to Georgia Tech and received a waiver for immediate eligibility. On January 19, 2019, Banks recorded a career-high 24 points and 11 rebounds in a 79–51 loss to Louisville. As a junior, he averaged 10.5 points, 7.8 rebounds and 2.5 blocks per game. Banks ranked 10th nationally in blocks and led the Atlantic Coast Conference (ACC) in that category during conference play. He was named to the ACC All-Defensive Team. On November 5, 2019, he tallied 20 points, 14 rebounds and five blocks, making the game-winning free throws, in an 82–81 overtime victory over NC State. On December 1, Banks posted 12 points, 10 rebounds and a career-high eight blocks in a 68–65 win over Bethune–Cookman. As a senior, he averaged 9.5 points, 7.6 rebounds and 2.5 blocks per game. Banks ranked second in the ACC in blocks and earned ACC All-Defensive Team honors for his second time. He finished with the eighth-most career blocks (154) in program history.

Professional career

Hapoel Be'er Sheva (2020–2021)
On August 1, 2020, Banks signed his first professional contract, a one-year deal with Hapoel Be'er Sheva of the Israeli Premier League. He said: "It was just a great overall situation for me, with the need on that team for a big like me, the opportunity to play in the Winner League, which is one of the biggest leagues over there in Europe ... There’s a lot of spiritual and holy things (to visit)... There’s a lot of history over there." In 2020–21 he led the Israel Basketball Premier League in blocked shots per game (1.8).

Birmingham Squadron (2021–2022)
In August 2021, Banks joined the Cleveland Cavaliers for the 2021 NBA Summer League and on October 9, 2021, he signed with the New Orleans Pelicans. However, he was waived prior to the start of the season. On October 25, he signed with the Birmingham Squadron as an affiliate player.

Texas Legends (2022–present)
On February 9, 2022, the Texas Legends traded for Banks, following season-ending injuries to both their centers, Tyler Davis and Loudon Love.

National team career
Banks won a gold medal with the United States under-18 national team at the 2016 FIBA Americas Under-18 Championship in Valdivia, Chile. He averaged 2.3 points, 4.5 rebounds and 1.8 blocks per game.

Personal life
When Banks was four years old, his father James Banks Jr. died in a motorcycle accident. In February 2015, his mother, Sonja, was paralyzed in a car accident. She worked as a paralegal before joining the ministry. He has an older sister named Marissa.

References

External links
Georgia Tech Yellow Jackets bio
Texas Longhorns bio

1998 births
Living people
American expatriate basketball people in Israel
American men's basketball players
Basketball players from Georgia (U.S. state)
Birmingham Squadron players
Centers (basketball)
Georgia Tech Yellow Jackets men's basketball players
Hapoel Be'er Sheva B.C. players
La Lumiere School alumni
People from Decatur, Georgia
Texas Longhorns men's basketball players